Ciprian Silviu Selagea (born 21 January 1990) is a Romanian professional footballer who plays as a midfielder for Metalurgistul Cugir. In his career, Selagea also played for teams such as Unirea Alba Iulia, FC Bihor Oradea, Rapid București and Olimpia Satu Mare.

References

External links
 
 

1990 births
Living people
Sportspeople from Alba Iulia
Romanian footballers
Association football midfielders
Romania under-21 international footballers
Liga I players
Liga II players
CSM Unirea Alba Iulia players
FC Bihor Oradea players
FC Rapid București players
FC Olimpia Satu Mare players